KEYH (850 AM) is a commercial radio station in Houston, Texas, under Special Temporary Authority from the Federal Communications Commission to broadcast at 100 watts from a temporary longwire antenna, on a tower located in Northline, North Houston. KEYH airs a classic hits format as "Houston Radio Platinum."

After the loss of its main transmitter site, due to the sale of the land the array sat upon, KEYH went silent from December 31, 2020 until December 27, 2021. KEYH's previous format, prior to going silent, was Regional Mexican, with sports programming interspersed. KEYH is owned by Estrella Media and upon getting back on in late 2021 temporarily rebroadcast Estrella Media sister station "La Raza" 98.5 KTJM. However in early 2022, KEYH began broadcasting classic hits as Joe 850.

Under normal operations, KEYH is licensed to broadcast with 10,000 watts; because AM 850 is a clear-channel frequency reserved for 50,000 watt Class A KOA in Denver, Colorado, KEYH was required to reduce power at night to 185 watts.  The former transmitter location was near Denver Miller Road in Sugar Land, Texas.

History
In 1974, KEYH first signed on as a daytimer, required to be off the air between sunset and sunrise.  It was owned by Artlite Broadcasting and aired an all-news format, affiliated with the Mutual Broadcasting System and the Associated Press.  The all-news format did not generate many listeners so talk shows were added.

KEYH's slogan was "The Key to Houston" and featured a long key with the station's 850 dial setting and call sign featured in its logo.  KEYH struggled to gain footing in the market and began airing Mexican music on weekends, while continuing the news/talk format weekdays.  With Houston's growing Mexican-American population, the Spanish-language music featured on the weekends proved popular.  By the end of the 1970s, KEYH went full-time Regional Mexican and became direct competition to the original Spanish-language station in Houston, AM 1480 KLVL.

KEYH has gone through several owners and variations of formats since then, including an incarnation of "La Ranchera" which marked the third time KEYH has used the name (both in conjunction with 101.7 KNTE Bay City and as a standalone).  In 2003, Liberman Broadcasting, based in Burbank, California, purchased KEYH for $5.7 million.

From 2018 to 2020, the station aired Spanish-language broadcasts of the Major League Baseball's Houston Astros.

References

External links

FCC History Cards for KEYH

Hispanic and Latino American culture in Houston
EYH
Radio stations established in 1983
Estrella Media stations